Knutsford (Shuswap language: Pellpépsellkwe) is a neighbourhood of the City of Kamloops, British Columbia, Canada, located on the south side of that city just west of Peterson Creek. It is named for Knutsford, Cheshire, by Robert Longridge, who took up ranching in the area in 1912.

References

See also
Knutsford, British Columbia (unincorporated)

Neighbourhoods in Kamloops